LNA may refer to:

Music 
 Late Night Alumni, a US house group

Organizations
 Libyan National Army

Places 
 Lantana Airport (Florida)

Products
 Citroën LNA, a Citroën car

Science and technology
 Linolenic acid
 Locked nucleic acid
 Low noise amplifier
 Launch numerical aperture

Trade 
 Licencias no automáticas previas de importación, Argentine non-automatic import license, prior to importation